The 2013 Pekao Szczecin Open was a professional tennis tournament played on clay courts. It was the 21st edition of the tournament which was part of the 2013 ATP Challenger Tour. It took place in Szczecin, Poland between 16 and 22 September 2013.

Singles main draw entrants

Seeds

 1 Rankings are as of September 9, 2013.

Other entrants
The following players received wildcards into the singles main draw:
  Paweł Ciaś
  Piotr Gadomski
  Kamil Majchrzak
  Albert Montañés

The following players received entry from the qualifying draw:
  Mate Delić
  Jan Kuncik
  Grzegorz Panfil
  Michal Schmid

Champions

Singles

 Oleksandr Nedovyesov  def.  Pere Riba 6–2, 7–5

Doubles

 Ken Skupski /  Neal Skupski def.  Andrea Arnaboldi /  Alessandro Giannessi 6–4, 1–6, [10–7]

External links
Official Website

Pekao Szczecin Open
Pekao Szczecin Open
Pekao